Verkhnesalimovo (Ürge Sälim) is a rural locality (a village) in Matrayevsky Selsoviet, Zilairsky District, Bashkortostan, Russia. The population was 174 as of 2010. There are 4 streets.

Geography 
Verkhnesalimovo is located 60 km east of Zilair (the district's administrative centre) by road. Balapan is the nearest rural locality.

References 

Rural localities in Zilairsky District